The River of Grace Community Church is a church in Seongnam, Gyeonggi Province, South Korea.

In 2020, the South China Morning Post reported that it had been the centre of a cluster of COVID-19 infections, claimed to have been caused by spraying salt-water into followers' mouths, under the belief that this would protect them from the virus. Around 70 devotees were tested positive after the spraying of the salt water and the incident caused a sudden spike in coronavirus cases in South Korea.

References 

Churches in South Korea